Lars Ole Vaagen (born 1 December 1956) is a Norwegian civil servant and diplomat.

He holds the cand.polit. degree and was hired in the Ministry of Foreign Affairs in 1987. He served as subdirector here from 1998 to 2008, except for the years 2000–2004 when he was an embassy counsellor in Geneva. Vaagen subsequently served as Norway's ambassador to Guatemala from 2008 to 2012, Venezuela from 2012 to 2013 and Colombia from 2013 to 2016. From 2016 he is a special adviser in the Ministry of Foreign Affairs.

References

1956 births
Living people
Norwegian civil servants
Norwegian expatriates in Switzerland
Ambassadors of Norway to Guatemala
Ambassadors of Norway to Venezuela
Ambassadors of Norway to Colombia